Fernando León de Aranoa (born 26 May 1968) is a Spanish screenwriter and film director.

León de Aranoa entered the film industry as a screenwriter. He made his feature film directorial debut with Familia, which won him the Goya Award for Best New Director. He is together with Pedro Almodóvar the awardee with most Goya Awards for Best Director (3), which he won with Barrio (1998), Mondays in the Sun (2002), and The Good Boss (2021).

Career
Born on 26 May 1968 in Madrid, Fernando León de Aranoa was drawn to painting since early childhood and wanted to become an artist. He was good at music and sports and had a passion for comics. Because of an administrative mistake, he enrolled into a degree in Image and Sound instead of an intended degree in Fine Arts.

It was while taking classes of Image that his interest in films was awakened. He also studied literature and writing; Joaquín Oristrell was one of his teachers. He began to write short stories, winning awards for his narratives. Meanwhile, he had a job drawing for an advertising agency, but quit the job to pursue a career as a screenwriter. With help from his literature and writing teachers, he found a job writing scripts for television. He became involved in films for the first time as a screenwriter on three undistinguished films directed by Antonio del Real. León de Aranoa then moved on to become a director, making the short film Sirenas (1994) which received a number of awards.

His first feature film was Familia (1996), for which he also wrote the screenplay. For this film León de Aranoa was given the Goya Award for Best New Director, as well as the Audience Award and Special Mention from FIPRESCI at the Valladolid SEMINCI festival. The screenplay was later adapted into a theatrical play produced in several countries.

In 1998 he wrote and directed Barrio, a portrait of the lives of three young teens in a slum. Thanks to this film, León de Aranoa received the Goya Awards for Best Director and Best Original Screenplay. The film was presented in the official section of the San Sebastian Festival, where León de Aranoa earned the Silver Shell for Best Director. The film received other major awards such as the FIPRESCI Prize, the Fotogramas de Plata Award for Best Spanish Film, the José María Forqué Prize, the Sant Jordi Award and the Turia Award.

In 2002 he directed Mondays in the Sun, starring Javier Bardem, which became a major winner at the Goya Awards that year, winning five awards including Best Picture and Best Director. The film also triumphed in the San Sebastian Film Festival, winning the Golden Shell for Best Film. The Spanish Academy of Arts and Cinematographic Sciences selected the film to represent Spain at the Oscars in the category of Best Foreign Language Film, although it ended up not being one of the five films nominated.

Princesses (2005) would be his fourth film as director and screenwriter, and his debut as a producer after he created his own production company, Reposado. The film was seen by more than a million viewers, and received three Goya Awards from the Spanish Academy of Cinema, for Best Actor, Best Actress and Best Original Song, composed by Manu Chao.  The Ondas Awards gave Princesses its Film of the Year Award and Best Film Actors Award. The film was also part of the official selection of the Sundance Film Festival.

As a documentary filmmaker León de Aranoa directed the Mexican film Walkers (2001), which won festival awards in Havana, Los Angeles, New York City and Alcalá de Henares. In 2007 he took part in the documentary Invisibles directing the chapter entitled "Buenas Noches, Ouma". This documentary also featured the participation of the directors Mariano Barroso, Isabel Coixet, Wim Wenders and Javier Corcuera and was given the Goya Award for Best Documentary. In addition, in 1994 he collaborated in the direction of Izbieglize, and in 2000 he wrote the script for the documentary The Back of the World.

In addition to writing his own films, León de Aranoa has worked as a screenwriter for other directors; he wrote the screenplays for Crazy Heart (1997) and Fausto 5.0 (2001). He has published several short stories, having received by Antonio Machado Prize twice. He has also worked as a cartoonist and illustrator.

His film A Perfect Day was selected to be screened in the Directors' Fortnight section at the 2015 Cannes Film Festival.

Filmography

Film

Documentary

References

External links
 

1968 births
Living people
Spanish male screenwriters
Film directors from Madrid
21st-century Spanish screenwriters
Writers from Madrid
Best Director Goya Award winners